State Highway 128 (abbreviated SH-128) is a  state highway in Le Flore County, Oklahoma. It connects U.S. Route 59 (US 59) in Heavener to the Arkansas state line, where it becomes Arkansas Highway 28. It has no lettered spur routes.

SH-128 was first added to the state highway system circa 1956. It has been realigned once, to better match up with roads across the Arkansas line.

Route description
State Highway 128 begins at US-59/US-270 in Heavener. From the terminus south of downtown, the highway follows West Avenue I to East 1st Street, where it turns south, running parallel to US-59/US-270. Highway 128 then curves east and exits Heavener. For the remainder of its route, SH-128 runs mostly parallel to a spur from the Kansas City Southern rail line; the road crosses the tracks once, just east of the Heavener city limit. SH-128 follows the valley of the Poteau River through east-central Le Flore County, running between the river and Poteau Mountain. At the highway's approximate midpoint, the route passes through unincorporated Forrester. From here, SH-128 follows a generally east-northeast heading before crossing the state line into Scott County, Arkansas. The road continues east toward Bates as Arkansas Highway 28.

History
State Highway 128 first appears on the 1957 edition of the official Oklahoma state highway map. The route has always been a paved highway. Initially, it did not connect to Highway 28 upon crossing the Arkansas state line. The route was realigned to directly connect to Highway 28 by 1961. No further changes have occurred to the highway since that time.

Junction list

References

External links

SH-128 at OKHighways

128
Transportation in Le Flore County, Oklahoma